Rodeo Rhythm is a 1942 American Western film directed by Fred C. Newmeyer and written by Gene Tuttle and Eugene Allen. The film stars Fred Scott, Pat Dunn, Loie Bridge, Patricia Redpath, Jack Cooper and Gloria Morris. The film was released on March 13, 1942, by Producers Releasing Corporation.

Plot

Cast          
Fred Scott as Buck Knapp
Pat Dunn as Jim Corey
Loie Bridge as Aunt Tillie Knapp
Patricia Redpath as Ellen Knapp
Jack Cooper as Joe Stegge
Gloria Morris as Gloria 
H. 'Doc' Hartley as Sheriff Bates
Donna Jean Meinke as Juanita
Vernon Brown as Slow Burn
Landon Laird as Lawyer
John Frank as Grandpa Twitchell
Roy Knapp as Roy Knapp

References

External links
 

1942 films
American Western (genre) films
1942 Western (genre) films
Producers Releasing Corporation films
Films directed by Fred C. Newmeyer
American black-and-white films
1940s English-language films
1940s American films